Red Mountain Pass may be one of the following:

Mountain passes
Red Mountain Pass (Larimer County, Colorado) – a pass in Larimer County, Colorado, United States
Red Mountain Pass (San Juan Mountains) – a pass between Ouray County and San Juan County, Colorado, United States
Red Mountain Pass (Sawatch Range) – a pass on the Continental Divide of the Americas between Chaffee County and Gunnison County, Colorado, United States